Saint Aventin was a French Saint and a hermit of the 8th century.

Life
Born near Bagnères-de-Luchon in the Pyrenees, Aventin became a hermit in the valley of Larboust.

Legends
A legend says that he performed many miracles. In one story, he was taken prisoner by Saracen invaders, he was locked in the Tower of Castel-Blancat, Saccourvielle. To escape he leapt from the top of the Tower, crossed the entire Valley and fell back without harm on the other side, printing its footprint in a stone. This stone is still visible on the threshold of the chapel built at this location.

In another, Aventin was beheaded but picked up his head and walked to the place where would be his tomb. Centuries later, this location was revealed to a shepherd who put the remains of Aventine on a sled drawn by cows, which stopped at the place where now the village of Saint-Aventin stands.

After his death there occurred an outbreak of plague ravaging the region. The local population appealed to the protection of Saint Aventin and the scourge disappeared.

Veneration
The cult of saint Aventin is found in the Val d'Aran and Aragon. On his birthday, June 13, there is a pilgrimage to his village. The Revolution saw the end of this tradition.

Gallery

References

8th-century Christian saints
Year of birth unknown
Year of death unknown